Mohra is a 1994 Indian Hindi-language action thriller film co-written, edited and directed by Rajiv Rai and produced by his father Gulshan Rai. It stars Akshay Kumar, Sunil Shetty, Raveena Tandon in the lead roles, along with Naseeruddin Shah, Raza Murad, Gulshan Grover, Paresh Rawal, Sadashiv Amrapurkar, Kulbhushan Kharbanda in supporting roles. The film was also the first collaboration between the trio of Akshay Kumar, Sunil Shetty and Paresh Rawal, who went on to collaborate several times later on.

Originally, Divya Bharti was cast as the female lead but she died very early in the production. Raveena Tandon was cast as her replacement. The film was reported to be inspired by the 1987 film Death Wish 4: The Crackdown. while the climax was inspired by the 1992 Hong Kong film, Hard Boiled.

The film was major box office success, went on to become the second highest-grossing Indian film of that year only behind Hum Aapke Hain Koun. It received nine Filmfare nominations in 1995 including Best film, Best director and Best Music director. Songs of the film also became huge chartbusters in that year. The popularity of the song "Tu Cheez Badi Hai Mast Mast", which was picturised on Raveena Tandon, led to her being nicknamed 'the mast mast girl'. The song was an adaptation of the popular Qawwali song "Dam Mast Qalandar Mast Mast" by Pakistani singer Nusrat Fateh Ali Khan. The film's soundtrack album sold more than 8million units, making it the second highest-selling Bollywood soundtrack album of 1994, behind only Hum Aapke Hain Koun..!.

Plot

In 1987, a convict named Vishal Agnihotri is imprisoned for killing four criminals who brutally raped and killed his sister-in-law Pooja. He initially tries to get justice for his sister-in-law in court but fails, and the men are freed from prison with the help of a corrupt public prosecutor. Then, the criminals visit Vishal's home because he tried to file a case against them. Driven by vengeance, they try to rape Vishal's wife, Priya, but she kills herself with a knife. Angered at all this, Vishal decides to take the matter into his own hands and murders the four criminals and the public prosecutor himself. He is sentenced to life in prison for the crimes, confined to a maximum-security prison.

7 years later, in 1994, when journalist Roma Singh visits the same maximum-security prison for a report that she's writing, a few of the convicts try to rape her. The attempted rape reminds Vishal of his misfortune, and he intervenes to save Roma. Roma hears Vishal's story and decides to help free him. She is heard by her boss, Mr Sandeep Jindal, (a blind businessman and owner of "Samadhan Newspaper" where Roma works) who reopens Vishal's case and convinces legal authorities to allow Vishal his freedom so that he can start living a normal life once again. 

Once Vishal is freed, Jindal tries to recruit him as a hitman. His responsibility is to kill some anti-social elements in the city, mainly the two powerful drug lords Jibran and Tyson and all the people who work for them. Jindal tells Vishal that these drug lords are responsible for creating people like the group of four men he killed in the first place, by bringing drugs to the streets and corrupting the locals with them. Vishal refuses at first as he has just got out of prison and now wants to live a normal life. However, the memories of his murdered family come back to haunt him as he spends a day alone and empty-feeling in his now-dusty estate, and he agrees to work for Jindal. Jindal convinces Vishal to kill Kamdev Kulkarni, the Commissioner of Police, at the end, pointing him to be the main culprit and protector of drug lords in the city. Vishal starts killing each of the drug suspects, one from Jibran's gang and the next from Tyson's gang, to ignite their rivalry.   

At the same time, a young and sincere Police Inspector named Amar Saxena is trying to catch the drug-trading suspects. He is unhappy about the release of Vishal, who he believes deserves to be in prison because of the murders he committed. Things become even more complicated when Amar finds Vishal at most of the murder scenes of criminals involved in drug trading. Meanwhile, Roma and Amar fall in love with each other and officially start a relationship. Amar's colleague, Sub Inspector Kashinath Sahoo, is very greedy and becomes an informer for Jibran, one of the targeted drug lords. He discloses all internal matters of the police department to Jibran in return for money, that too as per the duration of his conversation throughout.   

Jibran, upon getting informed by Kashinath Sahoo that the hitman who is eliminating his gang members is none other than Vishal, calls Tyson to meet and ease out the misunderstanding. Vishal surreptitiously shoots Tyson at the meeting, making two gangs fall upon each other and get killed incidentally. Jibran gets wounded as Tyson shoots him but pretends to be dead, thereby saving himself from Vishal and watches Vishal shooting Tyson at point-blank range. Finally, Vishal approaches to kill commissioner Kamdev but overhears the conversation between a drunk Kamdev and Constable Kranti Kumar, where Kamdev thinks that the unknown murderer is actually helping society to get rid of dirty elements, which the police could never do because of legal flaws and lack of proofs. Vishal has changed his mind and refuses to kill Kamdev.

Upon meeting his boss the next day at one of his lodges, Vishal informs that while most of the anti-social elements have been eliminated, Kamdev is spared. Jindal is enraged upon hearing Vishal's decision and reminds Vishal to only follow orders, keeping aside his feelings. However, Vishal confronts Jindal and demands to know the truth about why he has been forced to become a puppet at Jindal's hand. Jindal strikes Vishal violently. Vishal attacks Jindal with a paperweight, but Jindal dodges it. A stunned Vishal then realizes that Jindal is not blind and is the real culprit pulling the strings the whole time. Vishal wants to kill Jindal instantly, but suddenly Jibran shows up and saves Jindal. Vishal is captured and imprisoned by Jindal and Jibran, the latter revealing himself to be in cahoots with Jindal.

Jindal reveals his past to Vishal. He idolized Jibran and Tyson in his youth but wanted to become bigger than them, thus he made them his rivals. He also confesses that he murdered his wife Pooja and Inspector Karan Saxena (who happens to be Amar's father) to cover up the truth of his corruption and faked his blindness to throw the police off his trail. Over the years, Jindal becomes wealthy and powerful through his underworld drug kingdom while maintaining his façade as a good-natured blind businessman and owner of Samadhan, a popular newspaper. Jindal and Jibran leave Vishal to die by rigging the lodge with bombs. 

However, Vishal narrowly escapes death and reaches Roma's house, asking for help. A few minutes later, Amar arrives and misunderstands the situation. He blames Roma to be in an illicit relationship with Vishal and refuses to listen to her. Vishal, upon being confronted by Amar, tries to tell the truth, but Amar is not ready to believe him. Finally, both start fighting each other recklessly and Amar knocks Vishal unconscious, throwing him in jail. 

Sub Inspector Sahoo, who is brought to Jindal by Jibran to give him important information about Vishal, tells him that Vishal is alive and will notify the entire truth to Amar and the Commissioner Kamdev by the following day. In the night, Jindal reveals his long-time attraction for Roma, thus unmasking his blindfold to Roma's utmost surprise and kidnaps her. The sub-editor Siddiqui, who tries to save her, is killed by Jindal. Jindal then drugs Roma to dance for him as he lusts over her beauty.  

Kamdev, arriving by the next morning, releases Vishal of his free will. Seeing this, Amar bursts out in a fury and accuses Kamdev to be an equally responsible culprit who helps gangsters all the time and protects them from being punished. Vishal confronts Amar and tells the truth about Jindal and everything that transpired in detail. Amar, who has been searching for his father's murderer for a long time, promises to take revenge on Jindal. 

Amar, Vishal and Kamdev go to Jindal's office to arrest him, but they find that Jindal has escaped. Jindal, at that instant, calls his office and upon receiving the call, the trio discovers that Jindal has kidnapped Roma in order to forcefully marry her and he taunts them to save her. Amar suspects an insider informing Jindal about their every single move, and that person is present among them. He blindly arrests Kranti Kumar, thereby letting Kashinath reveal his other side and getting caught red-handed. Now, being cornered, Kashinath has to reveal Jindal's location and helps Vishal and Amar trace Jindal to an abandoned fort where drug lords from all over the country have been assembled to trigger a vicious and aggressive drug cartel from the next morning, thereby partnering with Jindal, who will become the undisputed leader.

After a melee, Amar and Vishal kill most of the drug lords, and Sahoo kills Jibran to save himself. Cornered, Jindal forces Roma to go with him but is confronted by Vishal. He tricks and shoots Vishal, and grabs him at gunpoint, thus compelling Roma to stay back and make Amar surrender his weapon. Deciding to sacrifice his life, Vishal forcefully takes control of Jindal's gun and makes Jindal mortally wound him, shocking  Jindal. Amar, who is holding his weapon till then, kills Jindal immediately and avenges the death of his father just as Vishal dies in Amar's lap, saluting him for one last time. 

The film ends with Amar getting rewarded by the government for his bravery and Roma's father, the jailor, announcing Amar's engagement to Roma. Just then, Kashinath Sahoo, who nearly escaped suspension for corruption, enters the scene and mimics himself blindfolded, similar to Jindal. While the others laugh at him and tell him to mend his ways, Kashinath replies by saying that he is trying to convince the government to pay more salary to police officers in the wake of rising inflation, so that they do not have to blindly accept bribes and put their fellow colleagues' lives at risk just to make ends meet.

Cast
Naseeruddin Shah as Mr. Jindal the main antagonist.      
Suniel Shetty as Vishal Agnihotri, Priya’s husband. 
Akshay Kumar as Inspector Amar Singh, Roma’s fiancee and husband.
Raveena Tandon as Roma Singh, Amar’s fiancée and wife.
Paresh Rawal as Sub-Inspector Kashinath Sahoo
Raza Murad as Jibran, a drug lord
Gulshan Grover as Tyson, a drug lord
Sadashiv Amrapurkar as Police Commissioner Officer Kamdev Kulkarni
Kulbhushan Kharbanda as Mr. Singh, the Jailor Roma’s father.
Avtar Gill as Inspector Karan Saxena, Amar's father
Harish Patel as Constable Kranti Kumar
Priya Tendulkar as Pooja Jindal, Jindal’s wife.
Yunus Parvez as Siddiqui, an editor
Vinay Sapru as Tony, Jindal's associate
Razak Khan as Rizwan, Jibran's brother.
Tej Sapru as Irfan, Jibran's nephew.
Vishwajeet Pradhan as Jackson, Tyson's brother.
Kunika as Flora, Tyson's kept.
Gavin Packard as Douglas, a drug lord.
John Gabriel as Rampal 
Poonam Jhawer as Priya Agnihotri, Vishal's wife.(cameo appearance)

Soundtrack 

The music for the film was composed by Viju Shah, with lyrics by Indeevar and Anand Bakshi. Mohra was one of the most successful soundtrack albums of 1994, especially the song "Tu Cheez Badi Hai Mast". The track is set to Raag Bhimpalasi (known as Abheri in Carnatic Music), and is based on the popular Qawwali song "Dam Mast Qalandar Mast Mast" by Nusrat Fateh Ali Khan. Initially, Viju Shah wanted Sapna Mukherjee to render "Tu Cheez Badi Hai Mast" but, upon Rajiv Rai's insistence, opted for Kavita Krishnamurthy instead. The song "Na Kajre Ki Dhaar" was actually composed in the 1970s by Kalyanji-Anandji, the father and uncle of Viju Shah, and sung by Mukesh, for a shelved film, meaning that the song was unreleased. Viju Shah added the song to this film, and got singers Pankaj Udhas and Sadhana Sargam to sing it.  

The film's soundtrack album sold more than 8million units, making it the second highest-selling Bollywood soundtrack album of 1994, behind only Hum Aapke Hain Koun..! The song "Tu Cheez Badi Hai Mast Mast" was remade as "Cheez Badi" for the 2017 film Machine. The song "Tip Tip Barsa Pani" was remade as "Tip Tip" for the 2021  film Sooryavanshi. The background score consisted of plagiarized versions of "The Terminator theme" and "I feel you (Babylon Mix)" by Depeche Mode.

 Track list

Box Office 
It was the 2nd-highest-grossing film of 1994.

Awards 

 40th Filmfare Awards:

Won

 Best Choreography – Chinni Prakash for "Tu Cheez Badi Hai"

Nominated

 Best Film – Gulshan Rai
 Best Director – Rajiv Rai
 Best Comedian – Paresh Rawal
 Best Villain – Naseeruddin Shah
 Best Music Director – Viju Shah
 Best Lyricist – Anand Bakshi for "Tu Cheez Badi Hai"
 Best Male Playback Singer – Udit Narayan for "Tu Cheez Badi Hai"
 Best Female Playback Singer – Kavita Krishnamurthy for "Tu Cheez Badi Hai"

References

Further reading

External links

1994 films
Films about rape in India
Films about women in India
Films about the illegal drug trade
Indian courtroom films
1994 action thriller films
1990s Hindi-language films
Films scored by Viju Shah
Indian action thriller films
Indian remakes of American films
Films directed by Rajiv Rai